Count Reinhard III of Hanau (22 April 1412 – 20 April 1452 in Heidelberg) was Count of Hanau from 1451 until his death. He was the son of Count Reinhard II of Hanau and his wife, Catherine of Nassau-Beilstein.

Reign 
In 1434, when his father was still alive, he took over the guardianship of the children of his widowed sister from her first marriage with Count Thomas II of Rieneck, when she remarried with Count William II of Henneberg-Schleusingen. When his father died in 1451, he took up government of the County of Hanau. However, he died only ten months later. During his short reign, nothing remarkable happened.

Death 
Reinhard III died on 20 April 1452 in Heidelberg. He had travelled to Heidelberg to be treated by a specialist at Heidelberg University. He was buried in the St. Mary's Church in Hanau.

For the next 200 years, all but one of the Counts of Hanau-Münzenberg were minors when they inherited the county and died before their 30th birthday, leaving the county to an underage son. The only exception was Reinhard IV. This pattern started with Reinhard III and repeated over nine generations.

Image 
A Late Gothic winged altarpiece at Wörth am Main from around 1485-1490 – originally from St. Mary's Church in Hanau – depicts Count Philip the Younger and his ancestors, including Reinhard III and his wife. Since this image was painted 40 years after Reinhard's death, it is reasonable to assume that it is not very accurate.

Marriage and issue 
He married on 11 July 1446 with Countess Palatine Margaret of Mosbach (2 March 1432 – 14 September 1457). They had two children:
 Philip I the Younger (1449–1500);
 Margaret (1452 – March 14, 1467), betrothed to Philip of Eppstein, died before the marriage.

Ancestors

References 
 Reinhard Dietrich, Die Landesverfassung in dem Hanauischen = Hanauer Geschichtsblätter, vol. 34, Hanau, 1996, 
 Reinhard Suchier, Genealogie des Hanauer Grafenhauses, in: Festschrift des Hanauer Geschichtsvereins zu seiner fünfzigjährigen Jubelfeier am 27. August 1894, Hanau, 1894
 Ernst J. Zimmermann, Hanau Stadt und Land, 3rd ed., Hanau, 1919, reprinted 1978

Footnotes 

Counts of Hanau
1412 births
1452 deaths
15th-century German people